Silk Stockings is a 1957 American musical romantic comedy film directed by Rouben Mamoulian, based on the 1955 stage musical of the same name, which itself was an adaptation of the film Ninotchka (1939). It stars Fred Astaire and Cyd Charisse. The supporting cast includes Janis Paige, Peter Lorre, Jules Munshin, and George Tobias reprising his Broadway role. It was choreographed by Eugene Loring and Hermes Pan.

It received Golden Globe Award nominations for Best Film and Best Actress (Charisse) in the Comedy/Musical category.

The score was embellished with the new song "The Ritz Roll and Rock", a parody of then-emerging rock and roll. The number ends with Astaire symbolically smashing his top hat, considered one of his trademarks, signaling his retirement from movie musicals, which he announced following the film's release.

Plot
A brash American film producer, Steve Canfield, wants Russian composer Peter Illyich Boroff to write music for his next picture, which is being made in Paris. However, when the composer expresses his wish to stay in Paris, three comically bumbling operatives, Brankov, Bibinski, and Ivanov, are sent from Moscow to take Boroff back.

Canfield manages to corrupt them with decadent western luxuries (champagne, women, nightclubs, etc.) and talks them into allowing Boroff to stay. He also arranges for his leading lady, Peggy Dayton, to "convince" Boroff to cooperate.

Fearful of his own precarious position, a commissar at the Ministry in Moscow summons a dedicated and humorless, fanatical operative, Nina "Ninotchka" Yoschenko, to bring all four men back home. Canfield succeeds in romancing her, despite her determination not to fall prey to the decadent attractions of Paris. He even proposes marriage. She and Boroff are horrified when they realize what changes have been made to Boroff's music. They decide to return to Moscow.

Canfield does not give up, arranging for the pliable Brankov, Bibinski, and Ivanov to be sent back to Paris, knowing that they will be seduced again by the city's charms. Ninotchka is sent after them, giving Canfield time to convince her to give in to her love for him.

Cast

 Fred Astaire as Steve Canfield
 Cyd Charisse as Ninotchka Yoschenko
 Janis Paige as Peggy Dayton
 Peter Lorre as Brankov
 Jules Munshin as Bibinski
 Joseph Buloff as Ivanov
 George Tobias as Vassili Markovitch, Commisar of Art
 Wim Sonneveld as Peter Ilyitch Boroff

Songs
Music and lyrics by Cole Porter.
 "Too Bad"
 "Paris Loves Lovers"
 "Stereophonic Sound"
 "It's a Chemical Reaction, That's All"
 "All of You"
 "Satin and Silk"
 "Without Love"
 "Fated to Be Mated"
 "Josephine"
 "Siberia"
 "The Red Blues"
 "The Ritz Roll and Rock"

Production
MGM bought the film rights to the musical for $300,000. Dance rehearsals started on September 18, 1956, and filming ended January 31, 1957.

Reception
According to MGM records, the film earned $1,740,000 in the U.S. and Canada and $1,060,000 in other markets, resulting in a loss of $1,399,000. On Rotten Tomatoes, the film has an aggregate score of 100% based on 5 critic reviews.

The film is recognized by the American Film Institute in these lists:
 2004: AFI's 100 Years...100 Songs:
 "All of You" – Nominated
 2006: AFI's Greatest Movie Musicals – Nominated

See also
 List of American films of 1957

References

External links
 
 
 
 

1957 films
1957 musical comedy films
1957 romantic comedy films
1950s romantic musical films
Remakes of American films
American films based on plays
American musical comedy films
American romantic comedy films
American romantic musical films
CinemaScope films
1950s English-language films
Films about the Soviet Union in the Stalin era
Films based on musicals based on films
Films directed by Rouben Mamoulian
Films produced by Arthur Freed
Films set in Paris
Films with screenplays by Harry Kurnitz
Metro-Goldwyn-Mayer films
1950s American films